USS Cassiopeia (AK-75) was a  in the service of the US Navy in World War II. She was the only ship of to bear this name. She is named after the Northern Hemisphere constellation Cassiopeia.

Construction
Cassiopeia was launched 15 November 1942 as liberty ship SS Melville W. Fuller by Permanente Metals Corporation, Richmond, California, under a Maritime Commission (MARCOM) contract, MCE hull 504; sponsored by Mrs. C. F. Calhoun; acquired by the Navy 27 November 1942; and commissioned 8 December 1942.

Service history
Cassiopeia sailed from San Francisco 21 December 1942 with cargo for Nouméa, where she arrived 12 January 1943. From this base, she offered essential support to the operations in the consolidation of the northern Solomons, carrying the varied necessities of war throughout the South Pacific. Between 19 June and 11 July, the cargo ship voyaged to Auckland, New Zealand, to reload, then returned with voyages from Nouméa to Guadalcanal until 9 August. Another resupply mission and a brief repair period in New Zealand preceded her resumption of South Pacific operations in November.

This pattern of ferrying vital supplies in the South Pacific alternating with voyages to New Zealand to reload continued until 6 June 1945, when Cassiopeia cleared Auckland for San Francisco, the Panama Canal Zone, and Norfolk, where she arrived 25 October.

Decommissioning
The cargo ship was decommissioned 21 November 1945, and transferred to MARCOM for disposal the same day.

Final disposition
Cassiopeia was laid up in the National Defense Reserve Fleet, James River Group, Virginia, on 21 November 1945.

Awards
Cassiopeia received one battle star for World War II service.

References

Bibliography

External links

 

 

Crater-class cargo ships
World War II auxiliary ships of the United States
Ships built in Richmond, California
1942 ships
James River Reserve Fleet